Bellamya monardi is a species of large freshwater snail with a gill and an operculum, an aquatic gastropod mollusk in the family Viviparidae.

This species is found in Angola and Namibia.

References

Viviparidae
Taxonomy articles created by Polbot
Gastropods described in 1934